Full Throttle Saloon is an American reality television series that premiered on November 10, 2009, and originally aired on truTV. The series chronicles the daily operations of the bar for which it is named − the Full Throttle Saloon in Sturgis, South Dakota. The world's largest biker bar, it was located on 30 acres of land purchased in 1999 by Michael Ballard. The indoor/outdoor bar included several large stages, a burn-out pit, a tattoo parlor, zip lines, a wrestling ring, restaurants, dozens of stores, hundreds of cabins for rent, and parking for thousands of motorcycles. It was open from late March/early April until mid-November (weather permitting), and was busiest during the annual week-long Sturgis Motorcycle Rally. Each year, the first full week of August marks the beginning of the Sturgis Motorcycle Rally, during which time, the Saloon could average 20,000 guests each night.

The series aired its fifth season with TruTV on December 2, 2013.   After five successful seasons with the network, TruTV confirmed via Twitter that they did not shoot a sixth season in 2014.  Reelz Channel announced that they would begin airing episodes on October 3, 2014.  Reelz confirmed they would only be broadcasting classic episodes of the show from previous seasons.

A massive fire destroyed the Full Throttle Saloon on September 8, 2015. Ballard later stated that the fire started when a pinched power cord to a keg refrigerator overheated and ignited a nearby cardboard box.

A sixth season aired on Destination America starting December 1, 2015.

Cast 
 Michael Ballard, Owner
 Angie (Carlson) Ballard, (wife of Michael), Marketing director
 Jesse James Dupree, Business Partner
Michael "Fajita Mike" Garner
 Gregg "The Goat" Cook, Emcee
 Eric "Senior" Soluri, Security Director
 John Caprefoli, Narrator; AKA Johnny Dare or some know him as Johnny Blaze

Episodes

Season 1 (2009)

Season 2 (2010–11)

Season 3 (2011–12)

Season 4 (2012–13)

Season 5 (2013–14)

Season 6 (2015)

References

External links
 

Biker bars
2000s American reality television series
2010s American reality television series
2009 American television series debuts
2015 American television series endings
Drinking establishments in South Dakota
Motorcycle television series
Sturgis Motorcycle Rally
TruTV original programming
Television shows set in South Dakota